FK Radnički Niš is a professional football club based in Niš, Serbia.

Managers

References

External links
 

 
Radnicki Nis